Hugo Sonnenschein (pseudonym: Sonka, Hugo Sonka) (May 25, 1889, Kyjov, – July 20, 1953, Mírov) was an Austrian writer from Bohemia. He contributed to the Czech-language Communist newspaper Průkopník svobody.

Literary works
 Die Legende vom weltverkommenen Sonka, 1920

References

External links

Sonnenschein, Hugo auch H. Sonka (English, German)

1889 births
1953 deaths
People from Kyjov
People from the Margraviate of Moravia
Czech poets
Czech male writers
German male poets
20th-century German poets
20th-century German male writers